"Fulanito" is a song by American singer Becky G and Dominican rapper El Alfa. It was released by Kemosabe Records, RCA Records and Sony Music Latin on June 4, 2021, as the second single from Gomez's second studio album, Esquemas (2022). A dance for the song became viral on the app TikTok.

Music video
The music video was released alongside the song on June 4. The music video was directed by both and shot in Miami, Florida.

Live performances
Becky G and El Alfa performed "Fulanito" together for the first time at the 2021 Premios Juventud on July 22, 2021.

Charts

Weekly charts

Year-end charts

Certifications

References

2021 singles
2021 songs
Becky G songs
Spanish-language songs
Songs written by Becky G
Songs written by Nate Campany
Songs written by Elena Rose
El Alfa songs